Chlidanotinae is a subfamily of moths in the family Tortricidae.

References

 , 2005: World catalogue of insects volume 5 Tortricidae
  1998: The genera of Tortricidae. Part III: Nearctic Chlidanotinae and Tortricinae. Acta Zoologica Cracoviensia, 41(2): 227-281.
  1995: Catalogue of the species of Tortricidae (Lepidoptera). Part III. Afrotropical Chlidanotinae and Tortricinae: Phricanthini, Cochylini and Tortricini. Acta Zoologica Cracoviensia, 38(2): 183-193.
 , 2010: Tortricidae (Lepidoptera) from Peru. Acta Zoologica Cracoviensia 53B (1-2): 73-159. . Full article:  .

 

Taxa named by Edward Meyrick